Anthony Arthur Long FBA (born 17 August 1937) is a British-American classical scholar who is the Chancellor's Professor Emeritus of Classics, Irving Stone Professor of Literature Emeritus, and Affiliated Professor of Philosophy and Rhetoric at the University of California, Berkeley.

Education 
Long was educated at Manchester Grammar School (1948–1955) and University College London (1957–1960) where he took a first class honours degree in classics and was subsequently awarded a PhD degree.

Career 
Between 1961 and 1971, Long held lecturer positions in classics at the University of Otago, the University of Nottingham, and University College London, where he was promoted to the position of reader in 1971. In 1973, Long moved to the University of Liverpool to take up the post of Gladstone Professor of Greek, a position he held until assuming the position of professor of classics at University of California, Berkeley in 1982. He retired at the end of June 2013 but continues to be active as a professor of the Graduate School, teaching courses in classics and philosophy, while pursuing his programme of lectures and conferences and visiting appointments and ongoing research.

While at University College, London he supervised the doctoral thesis of David Sedley, the seventh Laurence Professor of Ancient Philosophy at Cambridge University. Special positions he has held include Kardinal Mercier Professor of Philosophy at the University of Leuven (1991), Belle Van Zuylen Professor of Philosophy at the University of Utrecht (2004), and Distinguished Visiting Professor of Philosophy at the University of Hong Kong (2013). Long is best known for his innovative work on Hellenistic philosophy.

He was elected a fellow of the American Academy of Arts and Sciences in 1989, Corresponding Fellow of the British Academy in 1992, and a member of the American Philosophical Society in 2009. He was awarded an honorary doctor of philosophy degree by the University of Crete in 2015.

Publications

Books 
 Language and Thought in Sophocles. A Study of Abstract Nouns and Poetic Technique (Athlone Press, London, 1968) 
 Problems in Stoicism, (editor) (Athlone Press, London, 1971, repr. 1996)
 Hellenistic Philosophy. Stoics, Epicureans, Sceptics (Gerald Duckworth and Charles Scribner's Sons, London and New York, 1974; 2nd ed. Berkeley and Los Angeles, 1986) translated into Spanish (1977), Greek  (1987),  Italian (1991), Hungarian (1998), Korean (2001), Japanese (2003), Czech (2003), Chinese (2021)
 The Hellenistic Philosophers. vol. 1 The principal sources in translation with philosophical commentary with D.N. Sedley (Cambridge University Press, 1987) transl into German (2000), French (2001) 
 The Hellenistic Philosophers Vol. 2 Greek and Latin texts with notes with D.N. Sedley (Cambridge University Press, 1987)
 Theophrastus of Eresus. On His Life and Work, (co-editor with P.M. Huby and W.W. Fortenbaugh), (New Brunswick and Oxford, 1985)
 The Question of Eclecticism. Studies in later Greek Philosophy, (co-editor with J. Dillon) (University of California Press, 1988)
 Ierocle, with G. Bastianini, in Corpus dei papiri filosofici greci e Latini, vol. 1 (Florence, 1992): pp. 268–441 
 Images and Ideologies: Self-definition in the Hellenistic World, (co-editor with A. W. Bulloch, E.S. Gruen, A. Stewart) (University of California Press, 1993)
 Stoic Studies (Cambridge University Press, 1996; repr. Berkeley and Los Angeles, 2001)
 The Cambridge Companion to Early Greek Philosophy, (editor) (Cambridge University Press, 1999)  translated into German (2001), Greek (2005), Portuguese 2008 
 Epictetus. A Stoic and Socratic Guide to Life (Clarendon Press, Oxford, 2002)
From Epicurus to Epictetus: Studies in Hellenistic and Roman Philosophy  (Oxford University Press, 2006)
Greek Models of Mind and Self (Harvard University Press, 2015) translated into Chinese (2015), Italian (2016), Greek (2019)
Seneca: Letters on Ethics with Margaret Graver (Chicago University Press, 2015) translated into Vietnamese (2022)
How to be Free: An Ancient Guide to the Stoic Life. Epictetus Encheiridion and Selections from Discourses (Princeton University Press, 2018) translated into German (2019), Greek (2019), Spanish (2020), Japanese (2020), Korean (2020), Arabic (2020), Indonesian and Serbian (2022)
Seneca: Fifty Letters of a Roman Stoic with Margaret Graver (Chicago University Press, 2021)
Plotinus, Ennead II.4 On Matter (Parmenides Publishing, 2022)
 Selfhood & Rationality in Ancient Greek Philosophy: From Heraclitus to Plotinus (Oxford University Press, 2022)

References

References
CV of A. A. Long

1937 births
People educated at Manchester Grammar School
Alumni of University College London
English classical scholars
American classical scholars
British scholars of ancient Greek philosophy
Corresponding Fellows of the British Academy
Classical scholars of the University of California, Berkeley
Academics of the University of Nottingham
Academics of University College London
Living people
Academic staff of the University of Otago
Classical scholars of the University of Liverpool
Classical scholars of the University of London